Ingrid Marie Spord (born 12 July 1994) is a Norwegian footballer who plays for Sandviken in the Norwegian Toppserien League and the Norway national team.

She played for Norway at UEFA Women's Euro 2017.

References

External links
 

1994 births
Living people
Norwegian women's footballers
Norway women's international footballers
Women's association football midfielders
UEFA Women's Euro 2017 players